Forever in a Day is the second studio album by American R&B group Day26, released on April 14, 2009.

Background
This album was recorded while the band was filming their popular reality show, Making The Band 4, Season 3. During the process of recording the album, Qwanell "Que" Mosley, had frequent arguments and disagreements with the other members of the group, leading the public to think he was "crazy", and even "bipolar". However the group worked out their issues and recorded their sophomore effort. Que of the group stated in a Twitter message that they are shooting the video for "Perfectly Blind". Will of the group also stated in a video message that they were on the set of the video for "So Good" on June 2. On June 24, the Truth Is A Lie video premiered. On the same day the Girlfriend video premiered. The album debuted at number two on the US Billboard 200, selling 113,000 copies in its first-week of release, becoming the group's second top five album on the chart. The album slipped to number eight in its second week on the chart, selling 37,000 copies. This is the last studio album featuring Qwanell "Que" Mosley, who went on hiatus from the group in late 2009, and also the last album released on Bad Boy Records.

Singles
The first official single, titled "Imma Put It on Her" was released for digital download on March 31, 2009. The second single was "Stadium Music". It was released onto iTunes before the album was released and now Day26 have released a music video for the single. It premiered on the 29 May 2009.

Track listing

*Co-producer

Forever In Your Eyes
Forever In Your Eyes is a video album only released onto iTunes. It contains 8 music videos from Forever In A Day. This is the track list:
"Just Getting Started"
"Imma Put It On Her" (featuring P. Diddy and Yung Joc)
"Stadium Music"
"Perfectly Blind"
"So Good"
"Girlfriend"
"Then There's You"
"Truth Is A Lie"

Charts

Weekly charts

Year-end charts

Release details

References

2009 albums
Day26 albums
Bad Boy Records albums
Albums produced by Bryan-Michael Cox
Albums produced by Tim & Bob
Albums produced by Danja (record producer)
Albums produced by Jazze Pha
Albums produced by Jermaine Dupri
Albums produced by T-Pain